This is a list of Bulgarian football transfers for the 2012 summer transfer window. Only transfers involving a team from the A PFG are listed.

The summer transfer window opens on 1 July 2012. The window was closed at midnight on 31 August 2012. Players without a club may join one at any time, either during or in between transfer windows.

Beroe

In:

Out:

Botev Plovdiv

In:

Out:

Botev Vratsa

In:

Out:

Cherno More

In:

Out:

Chernomorets Burgas

In:

Out:

CSKA Sofia

In:

Out:

Etar 1924

In:

Out:

Levski Sofia

In:

Out:

Litex Lovech

In:

Out:

Lokomotiv Plovdiv

In:

Out:

Lokomotiv Sofia

In:

Out:

Ludogorets Razgrad

In:

Out:

Minyor Pernik

In:

Out:

Montana

In:

Out:

Pirin Gotse Delchev

In:

Out:

Slavia Sofia

In:

Out:

See also
 List of Cypriot football transfers summer 2012
 List of Dutch football transfers summer 2012
 List of English football transfers summer 2012
 List of Maltese football transfers summer 2012
 List of German football transfers summer 2012
 List of Greek football transfers summer 2012
 List of Portuguese football transfers summer 2012
 List of Spanish football transfers summer 2012
 List of Latvian football transfers summer 2012
 List of Serbian football transfers summer 2012

References

Bulgaria
Summer 2012